Zafar Alam is an Indian politician from the Samajwadi Party. He served as an MLA following the 2012 Uttar Pradesh Assembly election from Aligarh constituency.

He lost his seat in the 2017 Uttar Pradesh Assembly election to Sanjeev Raja of the Bharatiya Janata Party.

References

1944 births
Samajwadi Party politicians
Uttar Pradesh MLAs 2012–2017
Living people
Politicians from Aligarh